Flavio Alonso (born May 11, 1968) is a Spanish rally driver. He is best known for participating in the Race of Champions during the event's tenure at Gran Canaria, the highlight being winning the 'Rally Masters' contest in 1992 and 1996. He also represented Spain alongside Oriol Servia and Emilio Alzamora at the 2003 event, losing in the final to the 'All-Star' team. He also reached the quarter-finals of the main event that year, but was beaten by François Duval.

He has competed sporadically in the Spanish Rally Championship and the European Rally Championship, and also participated in the Spanish round of the 1999 World Rally Championship.

References

1968 births
Living people
Spanish rally drivers
World Rally Championship drivers
Place of birth missing (living people)